Neosho Wholesale Grocery Company, also known as North Transfer and Storage, is a historic warehouse building located at Neosho, Newton County, Missouri. The north section was built in 1908, and the south section added about 1922.  The two- to three-story brick building features large storefronts, a corbelled brick cornice, and a painted wall sign.

It was listed on the National Register of Historic Places in 2013.

References

Industrial buildings and structures on the National Register of Historic Places in Missouri
Industrial buildings completed in 1908
Buildings and structures in Newton County, Missouri
National Register of Historic Places in Newton County, Missouri
Warehouses on the National Register of Historic Places
Grocery store buildings